Frank Edward Mahar (December 4, 1878 – December 5, 1961), was a Major League Baseball outfielder who played in  with the Philadelphia Phillies. Mahar played in 1 game, going hitless in one at bat.

He was born in Natick, Massachusetts and died in Somerville, Massachusetts.

External links

Major League Baseball outfielders
Philadelphia Phillies players
Baseball players from Massachusetts
1878 births
1961 deaths